A plaque-forming unit (PFU) is a measure used in virology to describe the number of virus particles capable of forming plaques per unit volume.  It is a proxy measurement rather than a measurement of the absolute quantity of particles: viral particles that are defective or which fail to infect their target cell will not produce a plaque and thus will not be counted.

For example, a solution of tick-borne encephalitis virus with a concentration of 1,000 PFU/μL indicates that 1 μL of the solution contains enough virus particles to produce 1000 infectious plaques in a cell mono-layer, but no inference can be made about the relationship of PFU to number of virus particles. The concept of plaque-forming units of virus is equivalent to the concept of colony-forming units of bacteria.

See also

Virus quantification

References

https://www.sciencedirect.com/topics/immunology-and-microbiology/plaque-forming-unit

External links
 Definition from Biology-Online.org

Virology